Woolwich Cricket Club was an English cricket club based in the town of Woolwich, Kent. It was formed sometime in the first half of the 18th century, or earlier, and its earliest known record is in 1754 when its team played two matches against the prominent Dartford Cricket Club. The club, or at least a successor of it, then played a number of matches from 1797 to 1806 against Marylebone Cricket Club (MCC), Montpelier Cricket Club, Croydon Cricket Club and other leading town clubs. After playing MCC in 1806, the club disappeared from the records. Throughout the period from 1754 to 1806, Woolwich's home ground was Barrack Field, part of Woolwich Common, which remains the home ground of the Royal Artillery Cricket Club (RACC). Mainstays of the club in its "Napoleonic" period were William Ayling, John Tanner and John Ward.

1754
Woolwich came briefly to prominence in August 1754 when the team played home and away games against Dartford which at this time was probably the strongest team in England. In both matches, the away team won but no further details are known. Both games were mentioned in the same report by Read's Weekly Journal dated Sat 31 August: "Dartford won away & lost at home against Woolwich on Sat. & Mon., Aug. 24 & 26 respectively".

1797 to 1806
In the years around the turn of the century, club cricket became fashionable in London and matches between the town clubs were popular. Woolwich reappeared in 1797 with two victories against Croydon, both at Barrack Field.

In 1798, the club played home and away against both Croydon and Montpelier. Following two substantial victories against Croydon, Woolwich lost to Montpelier at Aram's New Ground and then drew the return at Barrack Field.

In 1800, Woolwich played home and away matches against MCC and won both, including an innings victory at Lord's Old Ground.  In what was a very successful season, the team also defeated Montpelier by 8 wickets at Barrack Field.

Woolwich played three more games against MCC at Lord's Old Ground between 1802 and 1804, winning in 1802 and 1803 but losing by 7 wickets in 1806.

Barrack Field
The CricketArchive database records over 800 matches, mostly services fixtures, as having taken place at Barrack Field.

Royal Artillery Cricket Club (RACC)

It is possible that Woolwich CC was merged into the RACC or alternatively that it disbanded after the RACC took full possession of Barrack Field. According to its own website, RACC first played cricket in 1765, having been started as a private club by Royal Artillery officers.  It was formally constituted as a regimental club as late as 1906. On 8 June 1818, RACC became the first services team to be granted a match against MCC at Lord's. A week later, RACC played MCC at Barrack Field in a match that was tied.

On 21–23 August 1862, RACC hosted the All-England Eleven (AEE) in an odds match. The venue is given as Woolwich Common, not Barrack Field. RACC had 22 players but still lost by 6 wickets to a team captained by George Parr and including great players John Jackson, H. H. Stephenson, Ned Willsher and Tom Hayward senior.

References

Bibliography
 G. B. Buckley, Fresh Light on Pre-Victorian Cricket, Cotterell, 1937
 Arthur Haygarth, Scores & Biographies, Volume 1 (1744–1826), Lillywhite, 1862

Former senior cricket clubs
English cricket teams in the 18th century
English cricket in the 19th century
Sports clubs established in the 18th century
English club cricket teams
Woolwich
History of the Royal Borough of Greenwich
Sport in the Royal Borough of Greenwich
Cricket in Kent
Cricket in London